The Regent of Iraq was a position established in 1939 and held by 'Abd al-Ilah until 1953. a regent, from the Latin regens "one who reigns", is a person selected to act as head of state (ruling or not) because the ruler is a minor, not present, or debilitated.

Reign of Faisal II

Notes and references 

Regents
Regents
Lists of Iraqi people